S&P Global Inc. (prior to April 2016 McGraw Hill Financial, Inc., and prior to 2013 The McGraw–Hill Companies, Inc.) is an American publicly traded corporation headquartered in Manhattan, New York City. Its primary areas of business are financial information and analytics. It is the parent company of S&P Global Ratings, S&P Global Market Intelligence, S&P Global Mobility, S&P Global Engineering Solutions, S&P Global Sustainable1, and S&P Global Commodity Insights, CRISIL, and is the majority owner of the S&P Dow Jones Indices joint venture. "S&P" is a shortening of "Standard and Poor's".

History
The predecessor companies of S&P Global have histories dating to 1888, when James H. McGraw purchased the American Journal of Railway Appliances. He continued to add further publications, eventually establishing The McGraw Publishing Company in 1899. John A. Hill had also produced several technical and trade publications and in 1902 formed his own business, The Hill Publishing Company.

In 1909, both men, having known each other's interests, agreed upon an alliance and combined the book departments of their publishing companies into The McGraw–Hill Book Company. John Hill served as president, with James McGraw as vice-president. In 1917, the remaining parts of each business were merged into The McGraw–Hill Publishing Company.

In 1964, after Hill died, both McGraw–Hill Publishing Company and McGraw–Hill Book Company merged into McGraw–Hill, Inc. McGraw–Hill purchased credit rating agency Standard & Poor's from Paul Talbot Babson in 1966.

In 1979, McGraw–Hill purchased Byte magazine from its owner/publisher Virginia Williamson, who then became a vice-president of McGraw–Hill.

In 1986, McGraw–Hill bought out competitor The Economy Company, then the United States' largest publisher of educational material. The buyout made McGraw–Hill the largest educational publisher in the United States.

In 1994, McGraw–Hill's broadcasting division signed a deal with ABC, due partly to the fact that its stations in San Diego (KGTV) and Indianapolis (WRTV) had already been aligned with the network, and that Denver (KMGH-TV) and Bakersfield (KERO-TV) joined the ABC family. (Bakersfield sister station KERO-TV was also involved in the deal between McGraw–Hill and ABC; however, that station had to wait for its affiliation contract with CBS to expire in March 1996, before it could finally switch to ABC).

In 1995, McGraw–Hill, Inc. became The McGraw–Hill Companies, Inc. as part of a corporate rebranding.

On October 3, 2011, McGraw–Hill announced it was selling its entire television station group to the E. W. Scripps Company for $212 million. The sale was completed on December 30, 2011. It had been involved in broadcasting since 1972, when it purchased four television stations from a division of Time Inc. The sale included McGraw–Hill Broadcasting's stations KERO-TV and KZKC-LP Bakersfield; KGTV and KZSD-LP San Diego; KZCS-LP Colorado Springs; flagship station KMGH-TV and KZCO-LD Denver; KZFC-LP Fort Collins; and WRTV Indianapolis.

On November 26, 2012, McGraw–Hill announced it was selling its entire education division, known as McGraw–Hill Education to Apollo Global Management for $2.5 billion. On March 22, 2013, McGraw–Hill announced it had completed the sale for $2.4 billion cash.

On May 1, 2013, shareholders of McGraw–Hill voted to change the company's name to McGraw Hill Financial.

McGraw–Hill divested the subsidiary McGraw–Hill Construction to Symphony Technology Group for US$320 million on September 22, 2014. The sale included Engineering News-Record, Architectural Record, Dodge and Sweet's. McGraw–Hill Construction has been renamed Dodge Data & Analytics.

In February 2016, McGraw–Hill announced that McGraw–Hill Financial would change its name to S&P Global Inc. by the end of April 2016. The company officially changed its name following a shareholder vote on April 27, 2016.

In April 2016, McGraw–Hill announced it was selling J.D. Power and Associates to investment firm XIO Group for $1.1 billion.

On August 3, 2020, S&P Global Platts launched S&P Global Platts Analytics fundamental oil information on the redesigned S&P Global Platts Developer Platform. The Platts Developer Platform offers customers with quick exposure to product price databases, business statistics and insights at the pace of market changes.

In November 2020, S&P Global agreed to acquire IHS Markit analytics company in a $44 billion transaction.

Corporate organization
S&P Global organizes its businesses in six units based on the market in which they are involved.

S&P Global Ratings
S&P Global Ratings provides independent investment research including ratings on various investment instruments.

S&P Global Market Intelligence
S&P Global Market Intelligence is a provider of multi-asset class and real-time data, research, news and analytics to institutional investors, investment and commercial banks, insurance companies, investment advisors and wealth managers, corporations, and universities. Subsidiaries include Leveraged Commentary & Data and Panjiva.

S&P Dow Jones Indices
Launched on July 2, 2012, S&P Dow Jones Indices is the world's largest global resource for index-based concepts, data, and research. It produces the S&P 500 and the Dow Jones Industrial Average.

S&P Dow Jones Indices calculates over 830,000 indices, publishes benchmarks that provide the basis for 575 ETFs globally with $387 billion in assets invested, and serves as the DNA for $1.5 trillion of the world's indexed assets.

S&P Global Commodity Insights
Headquartered in London, S&P Global Commodity Insights is a provider of information and a source of benchmark price assessments for the commodities, energy, petrochemicals, metals, and agriculture markets. It has offices in more than 15 cities, including major energy centres such as London, Tokyo, Dubai, Singapore, and Houston, and international business centres such as São Paulo, Shanghai, and New York City.

S&P Global Mobility

S&P Global Engineering Solutions

Presidents of the company
 James H. McGraw (1917–1928)
 Johnathan Heflin (1928–1948)
 James McGraw Jr. (1948–1950)
 Curtis W. McGraw (1950–1953)
 Donald C. McGraw (1953–1968)
 Shelton Fisher (1968–1974)
 Harold McGraw Jr. (1974–1983)
 Joseph Dionne (1983–1998)
 Harold W. McGraw III (1998–2013)
 Douglas L. Peterson (2013–present)

Acquisitions
During the course of its history, McGraw Hill and from 2016 S&P Global has expanded significantly through acquisition, not just within the publishing industry but also into other areas such as financial services (the purchase of Standard & Poor's in 1966) and broadcasting (the 1972 acquisition of Time-Life Broadcasting). The publishing and education assets are a part of McGraw–Hill Education from the company separation in 2013.

Note that this list only includes acquisitions made by McGraw–Hill, not its subsidiaries. McGraw–Hill typically does not release financial information regarding its acquisitions or divestitures.

Divestitures
After acquiring a portfolio of diverse companies, McGraw Hill later divested itself of many units to form McGraw Hill Financial which is now S&P Global.

Note that this list only includes divestitures made by McGraw–Hill, not its subsidiaries.

McGraw–Hill Building

The company was based at 1221 Avenue of the Americas until July 2015.
The predecessor company McGraw Hill Inc. had been based at 330 West 42nd Street and both have been known as The McGraw–Hill Building, a name originally used for a prior headquarters at 469 Tenth Avenue.

Connection to the family of George W. Bush
The McGraws and the George W. Bush family have close ties dating back several generations. Harold McGraw Jr. (deceased) was a member of the national grant advisory and founding board of the Barbara Bush Foundation for Family Literacy.

McGraw–Hill Federal Credit Union
Established in 1935, the McGraw–Hill Federal Credit Union originally served employees of the McGraw–Hill companies in New York City only. The credit union moved from its location inside the McGraw–Hill building to East Windsor, New Jersey, in 2005. Its accounts are insured by the National Credit Union Administration. It provides savings, checking accounts, CDs, money-market accounts, IRAs, credit cards, auto loans, and home mortgages. In February 2019, the credit union announced plans to merge with Pentagon Federal Credit Union, completing to convert customers to those of PenFed on May 1, 2019. The East Windsor branch currently operates as a PenFed branch as of September 2019.

Awards
In 1999, the National Building Museum presented the McGraw–Hill Companies with its annual Honor Award for the corporation's contributions to the built environment.

References

External links

 

 
Financial data vendors
Publicly traded companies based in New York City
Publishing companies established in 1917
Financial services companies established in 1917
1917 establishments in New York (state)
Financial services companies of the United States
Companies listed on the New York Stock Exchange
Financial technology companies